The discography of rapper Flesh-n-Bone of Cleveland rap group Bone Thugs-n-Harmony.

Albums

Compilations

EPs

Guest appearances

Albums with Bone Thugs-N-Harmony

References 

Hip hop discographies
Discographies of American artists